Chris or Christopher Mahoney or Mahony may refer to:

Chris Mahony (1981-), rugby union player
Chris Mahoney (baseball) (1885–1954), Major League Baseball player
Chris Mahoney (rower) (1959-), British rower
Christopher Mahoney (general), U.S. Marine Corps general